Matki (or matka) is an Urdu and Hindi word used for an earthen pot. It is used all over the Indian subcontinent, as a home "water storage cooler". It has been in use since ancient times and can be found in houses of every class.

Production
They are made by the combination of two types of clay: the first is taken from the surface of the earth and the second after digging more than 10 feet deeper into the earth. Making a matka is a long process of at least 8 days. The clay is mixed with water, shaped, finished, polished, dried and fired in a kiln for 5 days.

Modern designs are fitted with taps.

Cooling process
The cooling process works through evaporative cooling. Capillary action causes water to evaporate from the mini-pores in the pot, taking the heat from the water inside, thus making the water inside cooler than the outside temperature. Hence it is used only during summer and not in winter.

Gallery

See also

 Kulhar
 Matka gambling
 Mashk
 Indian pottery
 Goatskin (material)
 Head-carrying
 Oven glove
 Pot-holder
 Trivet
 Tumpline

References

Containers
Indian pottery
Pakistani pottery
Pottery shapes